Cristian Ojovan (born 4 January 1997) is a Moldovan rugby union player. He plays for Clermont in Top 14.

References

External link

1997 births
Living people
Moldovan rugby union players
ASM Clermont Auvergne players
Moldovan expatriate rugby union players
Stade Aurillacois Cantal Auvergne players
Moldovan expatriate sportspeople in France
Expatriate rugby union players in France
Rugby union props